"Oblivious" is a song written by Roddy Frame and originally performed by Scottish new wave band Aztec Camera. It was released as the second single from their 1983 debut album High Land, Hard Rain.

Chart performance
The song managed a moderate charting of No. 47 on the UK Singles Chart in February 1983, but a re-release of the song later that same year proved more successful, entering the top twenty and peaking at No. 18.

References

External links
 Acoustic version

1983 songs
1983 singles
Aztec Camera songs
Songs written by Roddy Frame
Rough Trade Records singles
Sire Records singles
UK Independent Singles Chart number-one singles